Gunfight at Rio Bravo is an American action western film, released in 2023.

Plot
The story revolves around two friends, set in 1874 in East Texas. After five women are kidnapped, they pursue the human traffickers who took them. Accompanied by an Indian scout, they race against the clock to find the women before the traffickers sell them at the Mexican border. Gunfight at Rio Bravo also features legendary gunslinger, Ivan Turchin.

Main cast
 Alexander Nevsky as Ivan Turchin
 Olivier Gruner as Marshall Austin Carter
 Joe Cornet as Sheriff Vernon Kelly
 Matthias Hues    as Ethan Crawley
 Natalie Denise Sperl as Nora Miller
 Kerry Goodwin as Jenny Gray
 John Marrs as Grady

Release
In November 2022, Shout! Studios acquired the film from Premiere Entertainment. The film was announced for a limited film release on January 13, 2023, with a digital release shortly after on January 17.

References

American Western (genre) films
2023 films